A helper virus is a virus that allows an otherwise-deficient coinfecting virus to replicate. These can be naturally occurring as with Hepatitis D virus, which requires Hepatitis B virus to coinfect cells in order to replicate. Helper viruses are also commonly used to replicate and spread viral vectors for gene expression and gene therapy.

See also
 Helper dependent virus

 Virophage

References

Virology